The second government of Israel was formed during the first Knesset. David Ben-Gurion made an attempt to form a minority government consisting of Mapai and Sephardim and Oriental Communities on 17 October, but it was not approved by the Knesset. Two days later President Chaim Weizmann asked Progressive Party leader Pinchas Rosen to form a government, but it was Ben-Gurion who finally managed to do so on 1 November 1950. The coalition partners were the same as in the first government: Mapai, the United Religious Front, the Progressive Party, the Sephardim and Oriental Communities and the Democratic List of Nazareth.

There was a slight reshuffle in the cabinet; David Remez moved from the Transportation ministry to Education, replacing Zalman Shazar (who was left out of the new cabinet), Dov Yosef replaced Remez as Minister of Transportation, whilst Pinhas Lavon replaced Yosef in as Minister of Agriculture. Ya'akov Geri was appointed Minister of Trade and Industry despite not being a Member of the Knesset. There was also a new Deputy Minister in the Transportation ministry.

The government resigned on 14 February 1951 after the Knesset had rejected David Remez's proposals on the registration of schoolchildren. Elections were held on 30 July 1951.

References

External links
Knesset 1: Government 2 Knesset website

 02
1950 establishments in Israel
1951 disestablishments in Israel
Cabinets established in 1950
Cabinets disestablished in 1951
1950 in Israeli politics
1951 in Israeli politics
 02